is a passenger railway station located in the city of Fukaya, Saitama, Japan, operated by the private railway operator Chichibu Railway.

Lines

Station layout
The station is staffed and consists of one side platform (platform 1) and one island platform serving three tracks in total. Track 3 is a bidirectional freight loop not normally used by passenger services.

Platforms

Adjacent stations

History

Nagata Station opened on 1 June 1913.

Passenger statistics
In fiscal 2018, the station was used by an average of 494 passengers daily.

Surrounding area

 Arakawa River

See also
 List of railway stations in Japan

References

External links

  

Railway stations in Japan opened in 1913
Railway stations in Saitama Prefecture
Stations of Chichibu Railway
Fukaya, Saitama